Avraham Betzalel is an Israeli politician. He is currently a member of the Knesset for Shas.

References

1981 births
Living people
Jewish Israeli politicians
Members of the 25th Knesset (2022–)
Shas politicians